The  Philadelphia Eagles season was the franchise's 78th season in the National Football League, and the twelfth under head coach Andy Reid. The Eagles failed to improve on their 11–5 record from 2009, finishing with a 10–6 record. However, they were able to win their division due to a tiebreaker over the New York Giants, who also finished 10-6. In the Wild Card round of the playoffs, the Eagles lost to the eventual Super Bowl champion Green Bay Packers.
The Eagles played all of their home games at Lincoln Financial Field in Philadelphia. The off-season saw a significant roster overhaul as Donovan McNabb and Brian Westbrook, two of the franchise's key players over the last decade, departed. McNabb was traded to Philadelphia's NFC East rival, the Washington Redskins, while Westbrook was cut from the roster and later signed with the San Francisco 49ers. Kevin Kolb was intended to be the Eagles' new franchise quarterback, however he was injured during the Week 1 game and replaced by Michael Vick, who started in 11 of 16 games (Kolb started in Weeks 4–6 when he was injured, as well as Week 17 with Vick and the starters resting for the playoffs.) With Vick at quarterback, they set franchise records, including a memorable comeback win against the New York Giants and a season-high 59 points in Washington.

Despite the losses of McNabb and Westbrook, Football Outsiders calculated that the 2010 Eagles had the third-best rushing attack of any single-season team from 1993 to 2010.

Offseason

Personnel changes
On January 11, 2010, general manager Tom Heckert was hired by the Cleveland Browns in the same position. On January 14, the Eagles fired special teams coordinator Ted Daisher in order to hire former Buffalo Bills special teams coordinator Bobby April, who opted out of his contract with the Bills, to a three-year contract. The team also fired strength and conditioning coach Mike Wolf and assistant strength and conditioning coach Jay Merlino. On January 20, the Browns hired Director of Pro Personnel Jon Sandusky as their Director of Player Personnel. They also hired college/pro scout John Spytek as a personnel executive. On January 25, special assistant to the defense Brian Stewart left to take the defensive coordinator job with the University of Houston. On January 27, the Eagles promoted Barry Rubin from strength and conditioning assistant coach to head strength and conditioning coach. They also hired Ken Croner as their assistant strength and conditioning coach. On January 29, vice president of player personnel Howie Roseman was promoted to general manager to replace Heckert. On February 3, the Eagles hired former Buffalo Bills head coach Dick Jauron as a senior assistant and defensive backs coach. They also promoted director of college scouting Ryan Grigson to director of player personnel and assistant director of pro personnel Louis Riddick to director of pro personnel. Anthony Patch was named assistant director of college scouting, Andy Speyer was named southwest regional scout, and Brett Veach was named pro and college scout. The Eagles also promoted defensive quality control coach Mike Caldwell to assistant linebackers coach, and promoted defensive coaching intern Mike Zordich to defensive quality control coach. On February 4, the Eagles hired former Browns general manager Phil Savage as a player personnel consultant for the 2010 NFL Draft. On April 1, the team extended President Joe Banner's contract through 2013 and promoted Senior Vice President and chief financial officer Don Smolenski to chief operating officer. On May 27, the Eagles hired Daniel Jeremiah, who was a scout for the Browns and Baltimore Ravens, as a scout for the West Coast region.

Roster changes

Free agents

Releases

Signings

Trades
On March 8, wide receiver Reggie Brown was traded to the Tampa Bay Buccaneers in exchange for a 6th round draft pick in the 2011 NFL Draft. On March 16, defensive end Chris Clemons and a 2010 fourth-round draft pick were traded to the Seattle Seahawks in exchange for defensive end Darryl Tapp. On April 2, cornerback Sheldon Brown and linebacker Chris Gocong were traded to the Cleveland Browns in exchange for 2010 fourth- and fifth-round draft picks and linebacker Alex Hall. Hall was later waived on July 28. On April 4, the Eagles traded quarterback Donovan McNabb to the Washington Redskins for a second-round pick in 2010 and a conditional third- or fourth-round pick in 2011. On April 19, the Eagles were involved in a three-team trade with the Denver Broncos and Detroit Lions; the Lions sent linebacker Ernie Sims to the Eagles, the Eagles sent a 2010 fifth-round draft pick to the Broncos, and the Broncos sent tight end Tony Scheffler and a 2010 seventh-round draft pick to the Lions. On July 30, the Eagles traded linebacker Joe Mays to the Broncos in exchange for running back J. J. Arrington. On August 30, the Eagles traded sixth-round draft pick fullback Charles Scott to the Arizona Cardinals in exchange for sixth-round draft pick cornerback Jorrick Calvin. On September 4, linebacker Tracy White was traded to the New England Patriots for a conditional 2012 pick, while offensive lineman Stacy Andrews was traded to the Seattle Seahawks for a 2011 seventh-round pick. On October 13, running back Mike Bell was traded to the Cleveland Browns in exchange for running back Jerome Harrison.

2010 draft class

Draft notes

Undrafted free agents

Contract extensions
Starting quarterback (at the time) Kevin Kolb signed a one-year contract extension worth $12.25 million on April 29, keeping him under contract with the Eagles through the 2011 season.

Staff

Final roster

Opening training camp roster

Roster cuts
In the first round of roster cuts, the Eagles waived guard Zipp Duncan, safety Ryan Hamilton, guard Greg Isdaner, linebacker Simoni Lawrence, and wide receiver Jared Perry in order to get down to 75 players on August 28.

In the second round of roster cuts, the Eagles waived cornerback Geoff Pope, defensive end Pannel Egboh, defensive tackle Boo Robinson, cornerback David Pender, wide receiver Dobson Collins, tight end Nate Lawrie, offensive tackle Jeraill McCuller, running back J. J. Arrington, safety Anthony Scirrotto and running back Martell Mallett on September 3. In addition, defensive end Victor Abiamiri was placed on the Physically Unable to Perform list. The Eagles also traded an undisclosed 2011 draft pick to the Arizona Cardinals in exchange for guard Reggie Wells.

On September 4, the Eagles traded for defensive end Antwan Barnes from the Baltimore Ravens, and gave the Ravens a 2011 seventh-round draft pick.  More second round cuts were announced, including wide receiver Chad Hall, wide receiver Jordan Norwood, tight end Cornelius Ingram, center A.Q. Shipley, center Dallas Reynolds, offensive lineman Fenuki Tupou, defensive end Eric Moncur, defensive tackle Jeff Owens, safety Macho Harris, and safety Quintin Demps.

Schedule

Preseason

Regular season

Note: Intra-division opponents are in bold text.

Postseason

Standings

Preseason results
Preseason Week 1 – vs Jacksonville Jaguars

Preseason Week 2 – at Cincinnati Bengals

Regular-season results

Week 1: vs. Green Bay Packers

The Eagles donned their throwback uniforms (in celebration of the franchise's 50th Anniversary of their 1960 championship team) and began their season at home for an NFC duel with the Green Bay Packers.  In the first quarter, Philadelphia had the early lead with kicker David Akers making a 45-yard field goal, but failed to maintain it in the second quarter with Packers kicker Mason Crosby nailing a 49-yard field goal, followed by quarterback Aaron Rodgers throwing  a 6-yard touchdown pass to wide receiver Donald Driver, followed by Crosby hitting a 56-yard field goal.

In the third quarter, the Green Bay fullback John Kuhn pushed up the middle for a 3-yard touchdown run, but replied with running back LeSean McCoy running in a 12-yard TD run. However, the Packers extended their lead with Rodgers bombing a 32-yard touchdown pass to wide receiver Greg Jennings. The Eagles cut the lead in the 4th quarter with quarterback Michael Vick tossing a 17-yard touchdown pass to wide receiver Jeremy Maclin, and with Akers nailing a 24-yard field goal, but couldn't do enough, giving the Eagles a loss.

With the loss, the Eagles began the season at 0–1. They also lost Leonard Weaver, who was considered to be the best fullback in the NFL in 2009 and had just been signed to a record-breaking fullback, to a career ending injury.

Week 2: at Detroit Lions

Hoping to rebound from their loss to the Packers the Eagles flew to Ford Field for an NFC Duel with the Lions. The Lions looked good early in the first quarter, but with 11:15 remaining, Shaun Hill was intercepted by Nate Allen. Just four plays into the following drive, the Eagles took the early lead when QB Michael Vick bombed a 45-yard TD pass to deep threat WR DeSean Jackson. Detroit replied, driving 76 yards in 6 plays with RB Jahvid Best hauling a 14-yard touchdown run, taking 3:00 minutes off the clock. After three combined punts, the Eagles then fell behind in the 2nd quarter when kicker Jason Hanson nailed a 49-yard field goal. This was followed by QB Shaun Hill slinging a screen pass to RB Jahvid Best, who took it 75 yards for a touchdown, widening the lead to 17–7. The possession took only three plays and barely a minute off the clock. Then the Eagles replied with an 11-play, 75-yard drive that ended with RB LeSean McCoy taking in a 14-yard TD run. After a Lions punt, the Eagles marched 89 yards in less than a minute with QB Michael Vick throwing a 9-yard TD pass to WR Jeremy Maclin. The Eagles led 21–17 at halftime. On their second possession of the third quarter, the Eagles scored again, with RB LeSean McCoy hammering home a 4-yard TD run. Things got worse for the Lions, as Shaun Hill was intercepted on their next possession by Ellis Hobbs. They managed to force a punt, but wasted a 12-play, 48-yard drive that took 5:49 off the clock. On 4th-and-1 at the Eagles 29, Jahvid Best was stuffed for no gain and the Lions turned it over on downs. Worse yet, the drive took into the fourth quarter. The Eagles seemingly put the game away on their next drive when LeSean McCoy scampered off to the races on a 46-yard TD run on 3rd-and-16 with just 6:27 left, and the Eagles lead 35–17. However, the Lions roared back with RB Jahvid Best finishing off an 85-yard drive with a 2-yard TD run, making the score 35–24 with 4:15 remaining. After forcing a three-and-out, the Lions stormed 56 yards in just 6 plays, culminating with Hill completing a 19-yard TD pass to WR Calvin Johnson (With a successful 2-point conversion). The Lions recovered the onside kick with 1:50 left, but four straight incompletions ended any chance of a miracle comeback.

With the win, the Eagles improved to 1–1.

Week 3: at Jacksonville Jaguars

Coming off their win over the Lions the Eagles flew to EverBank Field for an Interconference duel with the Jaguars. The Eagles took the lead in the first quarter when QB Michael Vick, who was named the eagles starter moving forward, made a 61-yard TD pass to WR DeSean Jackson. The lead was narrowed in the second quarter when kicker Josh Scobee made a 51-yard field goal. But the Eagles pulled away when Vick found WR Jeremy Maclin on a 16-yard touchdown pass and then a 45-yard touchdown pass in the third quarter. Then Vick scrambled 17 yards into the endzone for a touchdown.

With the win, The Eagles not only improved to 2–1, but also got their first-ever win over the Jaguars in four games.

Week 4: vs. Washington Redskins

Coming off their dominating road win over the Jaguars, the Eagles went home for their Week 4 NFC East duel with the Washington Redskins, as quarterback Donovan McNabb made his highly anticipated return to Philadelphia.

The Eagles trailed in the first quarter as Redskins running back Ryan Torain got a 12-yard touchdown run, followed by McNabb's 31-yard touchdown pass to tight end Chris Cooley.  Philadelphia answered in the second quarter with kicker David Akers making a 49-yard field goal, but Washington came right back with kicker Graham Gano's 26-yard field goal.  Afterwards, the Eagles closed out the half with Akers' 23-yard field goal.  After a scoreless third quarter, Philadelphia tried to rally in the fourth quarter as quarterback Kevin Kolb hooked up with tight end Brent Celek.  However, the Redskins' defense prevented any further progress.

With the loss, the Eagles fell to 2–2.

Week 5: at San Francisco 49ers

Hoping to rebound from their divisional home loss to the Redskins, the Eagles flew to Candlestick Park for a Week 5 Sunday night duel with the San Francisco 49ers.  Kevin Kolb was back under center for the eagles in this game. Philadelphia trailed early in the first quarter as 49ers quarterback Alex Smith completed a 7-yard touchdown pass to wide receiver Michael Crabtree, yet the Eagles responded with quarterback Kevin Kolb finding tight end Brent Celek on an 8-yard touchdown pass.  Philadelphia would take the lead in the second quarter as kicker David Akers booted a 33-yard field goal, followed a 39-yard touchdown run from running back LeSean McCoy.  Afterwards, San Francisco would close out the half with a 50-yard field goal from kicker Joe Nedney.  After a scoreless third quarter, the Eagles added onto their lead in the fourth quarter as safety Quintin Mikell returned a fumble 52 yards for a touchdown.  The 49ers began to rally as Smith connected a 7-yard touchdown pass to tight end Vernon Davis, yet Akers came right back as he gave Philadelphia a 45-yard field goal.  San Francisco tried to rally as Smith completed a 1-yard touchdown pass to running back Frank Gore, yet Philadelphia's defense held on to preserve the victory.

With the win, the Eagles improved to 3–2.

Week 6: vs. Atlanta Falcons

The Eagles' sixth game was an NFC duel against the Falcons at home. In the first quarter the Eagles struck first as WR DeSean Jackson got an early touchdown on a 31-yard run. Later in the quarter QB Kevin Kolb connected to him on a 34-yard TD pass. The Eagles continued to dominate when Kolb found WR Jeremy Maclin on an 8-yard TD pass. The Falcons replied with QB Matt Ryan making a 1-yard TD pass to TE Tony Gonzalez. This was followed in the third quarter by kicker Matt Bryant hitting a 26-yard field goal. However, the Eagles continued to score when Kolb found Maclin again on an 83-yard TD pass. The Falcons replied with Ryan making a 13-yard TD pass to Gonzalez. The Eagles pulled away with kicker David Akers making a 30-yard field goal.

With the win, the Eagles improved to 4–2.

Week 7: at Tennessee Titans

Hoping to increase their winning streak the Eagles flew to LP Field for an Interconference duel with the Titans. In the second quarter the Eagles took the lead with kicker David Akers making a 25-yard field goal. But they trailed when QB Kerry Collins completed a 26-yard TD pass to WR Kenny Britt. The Eagles replied with QB Kevin Kolb making a 5-yard TD pass to WR Riley Cooper, followed by kicker David Akers hitting a 46-yard field goal. In the third quarter the Eagles increased their lead with Akers making a 46-yard field goal. The Titans answered with kicker Rob Bironas nailing a 41-yard field goal, but the Eagles continued to score in the 4th with Akers hitting a 28-yard field goal. Eventually, they fell behind with Collins completing an 80-yard TD pass to Britt, followed by Bironas hitting a 38-yard field goal. Collins found Britt for the third time in the game on a 16-yard TD pass, and then Bironas made a 33-yard field goal. The Eagles had more problems when Kolb's pass was intercepted by CB Cortland Finnegan and returned 41 yards for a touchdown.

With the loss, the Eagles went into their bye week at 4–3. Andy Reid announced that Michael Vick would regain the starting quarterback position after the bye week, effectively ending any quarterback controversy

Week 9: vs. Indianapolis Colts

The Eagles' eighth game was an Interconference duel with the Colts at home. In the first quarter the Eagles Took the lead as QB Michael Vick completed a 9-yard TD pass to WR DeSean Jackson. This was followed by kicker David Akers' 22- and 21-yard field goals. The Colts replied with QB Peyton Manning completing a 3-yard TD pass to TE Jacob Tamme. The Eagles extended their lead after Akers nailed a 31-yard field goal. They eventually trailed by 1 point after RB Javarris James got a 6-yard TD run, followed by kicker Adam Vinatieri making a 37-yard field goal. The Eagles got the lead back in the 3rd quarter after Akers got a 44-yard field goal, followed by Vick scrambling a yard to the endzone for a touchdown. The Colts narrowed the lead when James got a 1-yard TD run, but in the final minute Manning lofted a deep pass that was intercepted by Asante Samuel.

With the close win, the Eagles improved to 5–3.  It was also the first win over the Colts for the Eagles since the 1993 season.

Week 10: at Washington Redskins

Coming off their home win over the Colts, the Eagles flew to FedExField for a Week 10 NFC East rematch with the Washington Redskins on Monday night.  Philadelphia wasted no time kicking off the first quarter as on the very first play of the game, quarterback Michael Vick found wide receiver DeSean Jackson on an 88-yard touchdown pass.  Afterwards, the Eagles added onto their lead with Vick's 7-yard touchdown run, followed by Vick finding running back LeSean McCoy on an 11-yard touchdown pass, along with running back Jerome Harrison's 50-yard touchdown run.  Philadelphia continued its dominating night in the second quarter as Vick hooked up with wide receiver Jeremy Maclin on a 48-yard touchdown pass.  The Redskins would answer with former Eagles quarterback Donovan McNabb completing a 3-yard touchdown pass to fullback Darrel Young, followed by a 3-yard touchdown pass to running back Keiland Williams.  Philadelphia responded with Vick's 6-yard touchdown run, followed by kicker David Akers booting a 48-yard field goal.

Washington began the third quarter with Williams getting a 4-yard touchdown run.  Afterwards, the Eagles went back to work as Vick hooked up with wide receiver Jason Avant on a 3-yard touchdown pass, followed by cornerback Dimitri Patterson returning an interception 40 yards for a touchdown.  The Redskins tried to rally in the fourth quarter as Williams got a 32-yard touchdown run, but Philadelphia's defense (combined with their 31-point lead) held on to preserve the victory.

With the win, the Eagles improve to 6–3.

The Philadelphia Eagles scored 59 points and 8 touchdowns, including 4 passing TDs and 3 rushing TDs. They racked up 592 yards of total offense, including 260 rushing yards and 332 passing yards. They were 4/4 in Red Zone Efficiency and 4/4 in Goal-to-Go Efficiency, were 8/13 in Third-Down Conversions and had 28 first downs. Michael Vick (20/28, 333 yards, 4 TDs, 8 carries, 80 yards, 2 TDs) became the first player in NFL history to have 300+ yards passing, 50+ yards rushing, 4+ passing touchdowns, and 2+ rushing touchdowns in the same game. This game became known as Monday Night Massacre.

Week 11: vs. New York Giants

Coming off their impressive win over the Redskins, the Eagles went home for a Week 11 NFC East duel with the New York Giants on Sunday night.  Philadelphia delivered the game's opening strike with a 4-yard touchdown run from quarterback Michael Vick.  The Giants answered in the second quarter with kicker Lawrence Tynes getting a 24-yard field goal, yet the Eagles replied with a 38-yard and a 24-yard field goal from kicker David Akers.

Philadelphia added onto their lead in the third quarter with Akers' 28-yard field goal, yet New York replied with quarterback Eli Manning completed a 2-yard touchdown pass to tight end Travis Beckum.  The Giants took the lead in the fourth quarter as Manning completed a 5-yard touchdown pass to wide receiver Derek Hagan, yet the Eagles struck back with a 50-yard touchdown run from running back LeSean McCoy (with Vick completing a 2-point conversion pass to wide receiver Jason Avant).  Afterwards, Philadelphia pulled away with Akers' 50-yard field goal.

With the win, the Eagles improved to 7–3.

Week 12: at Chicago Bears

Coming off their win over the Giants the Eagles flew to Soldier Field for an NFC duel with the Bears. The Eagles had the early advantage with kicker David Akers nailing a 45-yard field goal. It soon disappeared after QB  Jay Cutler completed a 10 and a 20-yard TD pass to wide receivers Earl Bennett and Johnny Knox respectively. The Eagles tried to cut the lead with QB Michael Vick getting an 8-yard TD pass to WR Jeremy Maclin, followed by Akers hitting a 36-yard field goal. But they fell further behind as Cutler got a 6 and a 9-yard TD pass to Bennett and Greg Olsen. This was followed by kicker Robbie Gould making a 23-yard field goal. The Eagles tried to narrow the lead as Akers got a 22 and a 36-yard field goal, followed by Vick throwing a 30-yard TD pass to TE Brent Celek, but the Bears' defense prevented any more scoring chances.

With the loss, the Eagles fell to 7–4.

Week 13: vs. Houston Texans

Hoping to rebound from their road loss to the Bears, the Eagles went home for a Week 13 interconference duel with the Houston Texans on Thursday night.  Philadelphia delivered the opening strike in the first quarter as quarterback Michael Vick found running back LeSean McCoy on a 1-yard touchdown pass.  The Texans replied with kicker Neil Rackers getting a 48-yard field goal, yet the Eagles answered in the second quarter with a 4-yard touchdown run from McCoy, followed by a 36-yard field goal from kicker David Akers.  Houston struck back with quarterback Matt Schaub completing an 8-yard touchdown pass to wide receiver Jacoby Jones.  Philadelphia would close out the half with a 22-yard field goal from Akers.

The Texans took the third quarter with running back Arian Foster catching a 13-yard touchdown pass from Schaub and running for a 3-yard touchdown run.  The Eagles regained the lead with Vick's 2-yard touchdown run and his 5-yard touchdown pass to fullback Owen Schmitt.  Afterwards, Philadelphia's defense prevented any comeback attempt from Houston.

With the win, the Eagles improved to 8–4.

Week 14: at Dallas Cowboys

Coming off their win over the Texans, the Eagles flew to Cowboys Stadium for a Week 14 NFC East duel with the Dallas Cowboys on Sunday night.  Philadelphia delivered the game's opening strike with a 1-yard touchdown run from quarterback Michael Vick, but the Cowboys answered with quarterback Jon Kitna completing a 1-yard touchdown pass to tight end Jason Witten.  The Eagles regained the lead in the second quarter with Vick locating offensive guard Todd Herremans on a 1-yard touchdown pass.  Afterwards, Dallas closed out the half with kicker David Buehler making a 50-yard field goal.

The Cowboys took the lead in the third quarter as Buehler got a 43-yard field goal, followed by running back Felix Jones getting a 3-yard touchdown run.  Philadelphia struck back with a 39-yard field goal from kicker David Akers.  The Eagles tied the game with a 50-yard field goal from Akers, followed by Vick connecting with wide receiver DeSean Jackson on a 91-yard touchdown pass and Akers' 28-yard field goal.  Dallas tried to rally as Kitna completed a 22-yard touchdown pass to Witten, yet the Eagles held on for the victory.

With the win, Philadelphia improved to 9–4.

Week 15: at New York Giants

Coming off their win over the Cowboys, the Eagles flew to New Meadowlands Stadium for an NFC East rivalry rematch against the New York Giants. In the first quarter the Eagles trailed early as Giants quarterback Eli Manning completed a 35-yard touchdown pass to wide receiver Mario Manningham. The Eagles responded in the second quarter with kicker David Akers getting a 34-yard field goal, but fell further behind after Manning found Manningham on a 33-yard touchdown pass, followed by kicker Lawrence Tynes nailing a 25-yard field goal, then with Manning getting an eight-yard touchdown pass to wide receiver Hakeem Nicks. The Eagles cut the lead with quarterback Michael Vick tossing an eight-yard touchdown pass to wide receiver Jeremy Maclin, but fell further behind with Manning finding tight end Kevin Boss on an eight-yard touchdown pass. However, the Eagles managed to break the lead and tie the game with Vick bombing a 65-yard TD pass to tight end Brent Celek, followed by his four-yard scramble for a touchdown and then his 13-yard touchdown pass to Maclin to tie the game at 31. After the game was tied the Eagles scored to take the lead with DeSean Jackson returning a punt 65 yards for a touchdown as time expired, becoming the first player in NFL history to do so. Fox commentator Joe Buck called the final play with:

Eagles broadcasters Merrill Reese and Mike Quick called the play on WYSP-FM in Philadelphia this way:

With the win, the Eagles improved to 10–4.

Week 16: vs. Minnesota Vikings

Coming off their miracle win over the Giants, the Eagles went home for a Week 16 intraconference duel with the Minnesota Vikings.  The game was originally scheduled for 1 pm on Sunday, but was bumped to a Sunday Night Football telecast due to the NFL's Flex Scheduling policy.  The NFL wants to ensure that every Sunday night game after Week 11 has playoff implications.  In this case, the Eagles had a chance to clinch their first NFC East title since 2006, and the sixth in Reid's 12 years as coach, with a win.  However, the game was pushed back to Tuesday due to heavy snow in Philadelphia (see below).

Philadelphia delivered the game's opening punch in the first quarter as quarterback Michael Vick found rookie tight end Clay Harbor on a 3-yard touchdown pass.  The Vikings responded in the second quarter with cornerback Antoine Winfield returning a fumble 45 yards for a touchdown.

Minnesota took the lead in the third quarter with kicker Ryan Longwell getting a 30-yard field goal, followed by quarterback Joe Webb getting a 9-yard touchdown run.  The Eagles answered in the fourth quarter with Vick's 10-yard touchdown run, but the Vikings pulled away after the Vikings scored a touchdown on a 1-yard run by running back Adrian Peterson.

With the loss, Philadelphia fell to 10–5, and is locked into the #3 playoff seed in the NFC.

Postponement
The December 2010 North American blizzard postponed the game until Tuesday, December 28, 2010, at 8:00 p.m. out of concern for public safety.  The game aired on NBC The NFL postponed the game shortly after noon, even before there was any snow accumulation in Philadelphia, after Philadelphia Mayor Michael Nutter declared a snow emergency for the city.

Eagles and NFL officials said that the postponement decision was made mainly out of concern for the safety of fans, vendors, suppliers and stadium workers.  The game was scheduled to end just before midnight Philadelphia time, during the worst of the storm.  Eagles COO Don Smolenski said the possibility of having over 72,000 people (over 69,000 fans plus 3,000 workers) stranded in the brunt of the storm made league and team officials conclude "it just wasn't safe" to play the game on Sunday night. League and team officials were also concerned that emergency vehicles wouldn't be able to make it through safely.  Indeed, SEPTA and New Jersey Transit, which are utilized by many Eagles fans coming to and leaving games, were forced to alter or cancel routes due to the storm.

The postponement decision was very unpopular in Philadelphia. Pennsylvania Governor Ed Rendell, the former mayor of Philadelphia and an avid Eagles fan, said that football was a game that was meant to be played in bad weather. DeSean Jackson tweeted, "It's only snow!!!! Let us play... It must be a lot of fun... I'm ready let's get it on!!" The next day, Rendell told WPEN-FM that the postponement was proof that the United States had become "a nation of wusses."  The front page of the Philadelphia Daily News had pictures of Nutter, Eagles owner Jeff Lurie, Eagles  president Joe Banner and NFL commissioner Roger Goodell in beanie caps, suggesting they were "wimps" for postponing the game.  However, Nutter maintained that the city could have had Lincoln Financial Field ready in time for kickoff, and the postponement decision was made by the league and the Eagles.

This was the 20th NFL game to be played on a Tuesday, but the first since . The last Eagles game on a Tuesday was September 26, 1944, when they defeated the Boston Yanks in the season opener. It was also the Yanks first regular season franchise game.

The Giants' loss to the Packers earlier on Sunday gave the Eagles the NFC East title. The Eagles' chances of contending for a first-round bye were ended with the loss to the Vikings coupled with the Bears' win over the Jets.

Week 17: vs. Dallas Cowboys

With their playoff position locked and basically all starters resting, the Eagles' sixteenth game was an NFC East rivalry rematch against the Cowboys.
In the 2nd quarter the Eagles took the lead as QB Kevin Kolb threw a 4-yard TD pass to WR Chad Hall, but after that the offense had problems after Kolb dropped the ball which was recovered 17 yards for a touchdown by OLB DeMarcus Ware. They took a slight lead with kicker David Akers hitting a 43 and a 22-yard field goal, but failed to maintain this lead when QB Stephen McGee threw a 4-yard TD pass to TE Jason Witten.

With the loss, the Eagles finish on a 10–6 record.

Postseason results

NFC Wild Card Round: vs. Green Bay Packers

Entering the postseason as the NFC's #3 seed, the Eagles began their playoff run at home in the NFC Wild Card Round against the #6 Green Bay Packers, hoping to avenge their Week 1 loss.  The Eagles had a terrific early scoring attempt. After a three-and-out, the Eagles drove into field goal range, but All-Pro kicker David Akers missed wide-right on a 41-yard field goal attempt. The Packers instead snatched the early first quarter lead as Packers quarterback Aaron Rodgers completed a 4-yard touchdown pass to tight end Tom Crabtree for the early lead. Green Bay added onto their lead in the second quarter as Rodgers completed a 9-yard touchdown pass to wide receiver James Jones. All the Eagles could muster in the first half was a 29-yard field goal from kicker David Akers.

In the third quarter, after an Aaron Rodgers fumble, quarterback Michael Vick found wide receiver Jason Avant on a 24-yard touchdown pass. The Packers countered right back with an 11-play, 80-yard drive which ended Rodgers chunking a 16-yard touchdown pass to running back Brandon Jackson, taking 6:17 of the clock. At 21–10, the defenses took over for much of the remainder of the game. The Eagles drove into scoring range early in the 4th quarter, but Akers missed another field goal, this time a chip shot from 34 yards, keeping it at 21–10. With 8:56 remaining, the Eagles took over at their own 25. 12 plays and 74 yards later, they faced a fourth-and-goal at the 1. Vick took the snap and rushed forward, barely breaking the plain for a 1-yard touchdown run (with a failed two-point conversion) in the fourth quarter. On the two-point conversion, Vick completed the pass to Celek for the score, but his back heel went out of bounds and back in before he caught the pass, making him an ineligible receiver. The five-yard penalty moved them back to the 7-yard line. Vick's next attempt was incomplete, keeping the score 21–16.  The Eagles forced a punt and got the ball back at their own 34 with 1:45 remaining. Vick hit DeSean Jackson for 28 yards to the Packers 38. After back-to-back incompletions, Vick hit Riley Cooper for 11 yards on 3rd and 10, moving the ball to the Packers 27 with less than a minute remaining. However, Green Bay's defense stopped the Eagles' final drive of the game as Tramon Williams intercepted a Vick pass intended for Riley Cooper again, in the end zone, with 44 seconds to go to preserve the win for the Packers.
Rodgers and Vick were both fantastic. The Eagles outgained  the Packers and won the turnover battle 2–1. However, the Packers had longer time of possession. Also, All-Pro kicker David Akers, who was 32/38 on kicks in the regular season, missed two easy field goals. With the loss, Philadelphia was eliminated with an overall record of 10–7.

2011 Pro Bowl
On December 28, the 2011 Pro Bowl rosters were announced by the NFL. Quarterback Michael Vick, offensive tackle Jason Peters, cornerback Asante Samuel and kicker David Akers were named as starters, while wide receiver DeSean Jackson was named as a reserve.

See also
 2010 NFL season

References

External links
 

Philadelphia Eagles
NFC East championship seasons
2010
Philadelphia Eagles